Iteuthelaira is a genus of parasitic flies in the family Tachinidae. There are at least two described species in Iteuthelaira.

Species
These two species belong to the genus Iteuthelaira:
 Iteuthelaira chaetosa Townsend, 1929
 Iteuthelaira esuriens (Fabricius, 1805)

References

Further reading

 
 
 
 

Tachinidae
Articles created by Qbugbot